Popowia velutina is a species of plant in the Annonaceae (custard apple) family. It is a tree endemic to Peninsular Malaysia.

References

velutina
Endemic flora of Peninsular Malaysia
Trees of Peninsular Malaysia
Critically endangered plants
Taxonomy articles created by Polbot